Chio Min is the name of a group of schools in Malaysia. There are 4 schools in the group.

Introduction 
Chio Min, in Chinese (觉民).

Member schools 
 SMJK Chio Min
 SJK(C) Chio Min 'A'
 SJK(C) Chio Min 'B'
 Chio Min Kindergarten (CRC)

External links
 SMJK Chio Min Official Site

Chinese_culture